Jeffrey Teague is an American music producer, publisher, and creative branding executive based in Nashville, Tennessee. He has worked with Ricky Skaggs, Harry Chapin, Kathy Mattea, Keith Stegall, Ray Stevens, Steve Forbert, Lobo, and Paul Overstreet.

Background and career 
Teague attended Palm Beach State College where he studied Business administration. After his education in Palm Beach he attended Berklee College of Music where he received his education in Instrumental Performance.

After attending Berklee College of Music in Boston, he worked in some of New York's premier venues and studios, as well as a musician in the Broadway productions of Oh! Calcutta!, The Best Little Whorehouse in Texas, and Annie. When Teague relocated to Nashville, he co-founded Stillman/Teague Music Productions serving as a producer and managing partner in the company where he was responsible for business management, account development, and company promotion. He delivered award-winning advertising and audio/visual projects for Procter & Gamble, Fifth Third Bank, AT&T/BellSouth, AMC Theatres, Cincinnati Fine Arts Association, Acme Boots, TNN, PBS, and several other notable companies. His early Nashville vocal talent production credits include: T. Graham Brown, Pam Tillis, Trisha Yearwood, and Joe Diffie, while project highlights include: TNN video segments, Crook & Chase "Weekdays" theme, Hurricane Hugo PBS Special, and Acme Boot campaign.

In 1990, Teague became owner and president of Earworks/Overdub Music. During the next four years, Teague was responsible for Independent A&R, music production, publishing, artist development and showcasing. Teague developed songwriters, copyrights, and publishing catalogues licensed through ASCAP, SESAC, and BMI. He handled the negotiation and execution of contracts, as well as song and copyright licensing and registration. During this time his client roster included: Warner Chappell Music, Columbia Records, MCA/Universal, and Word Records.

Between 1994 and 1999 Teague served as GM/Vice President for Word Nashville. He represented his division and parent company, Gaylord Entertainment, for industry-wide events and functions. He provided A&R direction/executive production for projects featuring Collin Raye, Kenny Rogers, Chet Atkins, Michael W. Smith, Ricky Van Shelton, Skip Ewing, and Gary Chapman, and compilation projects featuring Patty Loveless, Rick Trevino, Shenandoah, Ricky Skaggs, and Doug Stone, among several others. From 2000 to 2007, Teague was Creative Director/Staff Producer for Seventeen Grand Studios in Nashville, a studio known for recording such artists as Tom Petty and the Heartbreakers, Jimmy Buffett, Shania Twain, Alison Krauss, Kenny Chesney, John Prine, Martina McBride, Travis Tritt, and Evanescence.

Since 2008, Teague has served as president and General Manager of Artist & Repertoire, LLC. Jeffrey Teague is a member affiliated with CMA, GMA, NARAS Producers & Engineers Wing, American Federation of Musicians, and SAG-AFTRA, ASCAP, BMI, SESAC, and SOCAN. He has also represented Jim Labriola, whose many credits include: Recurring TV cast roles on Home Improvement, A&E Specials Comedy on the Road, Caroline’s Comedy Hour and feature film roles in Disney's The Santa Clause and Joe Somebody for 20th Century Fox. His work landed Alecia Elliott a recording contract with MCA/Universal, booking representation with CAA, and on-screen roles with All About Us and Tom Sawyer. He led the writing and production of the Emmy Award winning "I Won’t Let My Guard Down" branding campaign for the National Guard featuring Darby Ledbetter. This campaign resulted in the placement of the music video in major theater chains nationwide and live performances at the Reagan Center in Washington, DC / NASCAR's Atlanta Motor Speedway, and the 2010 World Series on FOX. 

His recording and touring credits include: Harry Chapin, Lobo, Ricky Skaggs, Ray Stevens, Kathy Mattea, Steve Forbert, Wet Willie, Jimmy Hall.

In addition to his career in the music industry, Jeffrey Teague is a U.S. Army veteran.

References 

Living people
American record producers
Berklee College of Music alumni
20th-century American musicians
Year of birth missing (living people)
Palm Beach State College alumni